is a Japanese football player. He plays for Fagiano Okayama.

Playing career
Ryosuke Kawano played for J1 League club; Shonan Bellmare in 2013. In 2014 season, he move to J3 League club; Fukushima United FC. In January 2018, after three seasons with Verspah Oita, he signed for YSCC Yokohama.

Club statistics

Updated to 10 August 2022.

References

External links
Profile at YSCC Yokohama

1994 births
Living people
People from Hadano, Kanagawa
Association football people from Kanagawa Prefecture
Japanese footballers
J1 League players
J2 League players
J3 League players
Japan Football League players
Shonan Bellmare players
Fukushima United FC players
Verspah Oita players
YSCC Yokohama players
Mito HollyHock players
Association football forwards